Tsaouni is a village and rural commune in Niger.

References

Communes of Niger
Zinder Region